Okara Cantonment is a cantonment adjacent to Okara in the Punjab province, Pakistan.

Location
Okara Cantonment is 10 km away from Okara city, and is located on the G.T Road. Okara Cantonment has three main entrance gates from the main road. The small town of Gamber is situated near the first gate, which is also referred to as the Al-Jehad check post.

References 

Cantonments of Pakistan